Gymnothorax angusticeps is a moray eel found in the southeast Pacific Ocean, around Peru. It was first named by Hildebrand and Barton in 1949. It is colloquially known as the wrinkled moray.

References

angusticeps
Fish described in 1949